The Pakistan Levies, or Federal Levies, are provincial paramilitary forces (gendarmeries) in Pakistan, whose primary missions are law enforcement, assisting the civilian police (where co-located) in maintaining law and order, and conducting internal security operations at the provincial level. The various Levies Forces operate under separate chains of command and wear distinct patches and badges.

About
The Levies are locally recruited but federally funded and are covered in the Federal Levies Force (Service) Rules of 2012, and the Federal Levies Force (Amended) Service Rules, 2013.

Organization
The Command authority of Each Levies Force is as follows

The Commandant or  Commandant of the Force, is the  Political Agent of the Agency or the District Coordination Officer for the local Frontier Region; the Commandant is assisted by two Deputy-Commandants:

 "Deputy Commandant (Operations)" means an Assistant Political Agent of a Sub-Division or an Agency or FR or any officer of the District designated as such officer by the Provincial Government, who shall be Deputy Commandant (Operations) of the Force in their respective jurisdiction to exercise such powers and functions as may be prescribed; and
 "Deputy Commandant (Administration)" means an officer of Federal or Provincial civil service or any officer of the District designated as such officer by the Provincial Government in their respective jurisdiction to exercise such powers and functions as may be prescribed and who shall be responsible to the Commandant for administrative and establishment matters of the Force.

The Director-General is an officer appointed by the Federal Government, to exercise such powers and functions as may be prescribed;

Director is appointed as such by the FATA Secretariat who shall have practical experience of civil administration in tribal areas and who shall exercise such powers and functions as may be prescribed.

Forces

Balochistan

The Balochistan Levies operate in the Pakistani province of Balochistan where it serves as one of two primary law enforcement agencies tasked with maintaining law and order in the province. The levies force has jurisdiction in most districts of Balochistan. The force has approximately 23,132  personnel in 2018 and traces its origins back to the days of the British Raj, and has continued to function for over a century. It is headed by a director-general and is mostly constituted by local security personnel, including Baloch and Pashtun officers. During the regime of Pervez Musharraf, the Balochistan Levies had been disbanded and merged into the provincial police force. It was restored in 2010.

Areas which are manned by and are under the control of the Levies are called "B-Areas" which constitute around 90% of the total area of Balochistan while those under the control of the Balochistan Police are dubbed "A-Areas" i.e around 10% . The levies have been praised for their efficiency and reliability compared to the police force; this is attributed to the fact that it predominantly consists of local officers who are familiar with and well accustomed to the political and law and order landscape of Balochistan, thus fulfilling the concept of community policing, whereas the police force predominantly consists of non-locals. It is also in charge of more areas as compared to the police, and yet has a lower budget, rendering it the "cheapest available law enforcement agency". However, many critics have contended that the force has been used by Baloch tribal chiefs to serve their own interests. The force has often been targeted by militants involved in the insurgency in Balochistan.

Khyber Pakhtunkhwa

The Levies in Khyber Pakhtunkhwa operate between the former Federally Administered Tribal Areas (FATA), the Provincially Administered Tribal Areas (PATA), and settled areas in Khyber Pakhtunkhwa known as the Frontier Regions (FR). Different from the khasadars, often referred to as tribal police who are appointed by tribal authorities, the Levies are appointed by the political administration on merit basis and are given arms and ammunition by the government. The 2018 sanctioned strength of KP levies was 11,739 personnel. The various Levies in KP report to Secretary Home and Tribal Affairs of KP. The Levies in Khyber Paktunkwa are covered under the Provincially Administered Tribal Areas Levies Force Regulation, 2012

 Malakand Levies, operates in Malakand Division
 Dir Levies (not be confused with the Dir Scouts, part of the Frontier Corps).
 Swat Levies (transferred to the Frontier Corps as the Shawal Rifles).
 Khyber Levies

Note that the Levies and Khasadar will now fall under the Khyber Pakhtunkhwa Police.

Gilgit-Baltistan
The Pakistani-administered region of Gilgit-Baltistan has also set up a similar unit called the Gilgit-Baltistan Levies Force. The most recent rules for the force were issued on 27 March 2017.

Recruitment
The Levies is a standing force consisting of locally recruited personnel  who must undertake a six month basic training course which covers "basic laws, investigation techniques, crowd control, basic intelligence, arrest and detention procedure, jail duties, drill, weapons training, field craft, bomb disposal, counter assault, traffic control, raids, watch & ward etc."

Uniforms
The Federal Levies Force (Amended) Service Rules, 2013 requires that the Levies "wear black shalwar qamees with brown chappli, white socks, black barretee cap and black belt whereas the JCOs will wear brown belt during duty hours."

See also
 Law enforcement in Pakistan
 Civil Armed Forces
 National Guard (Pakistan)
 Levy (disambiguation)

References

Law enforcement agencies of Pakistan